Arthur Allen Fletcher (December 22, 1924 – July 12, 2005) was an American government official, widely referred to as the "father of affirmative action" as he was largely responsible for the Revised Philadelphia Plan.

Biography
Arthur Fletcher, a Republican, graduated from Washburn University and obtained a degree from distance learning school La Salle Extension University.

In 1950, he played two games with the NFL's Baltimore Colts, thus becoming the first Black professional player in any sport in the city's history.

Fletcher moved with his wife, Bernyce, and two youngest children to Pasco, Washington, where he took a job with the Hanford Atomic Energy Project. He also organized a community self-help program in predominantly black East Pasco and landed a seat on the Pasco City Council. In 1968, Fletcher ran for Lieutenant Governor of Washington State and narrowly lost to the incumbent, John Cherberg. Fletcher was the first African American in Washington as well as the West to contest a statewide electoral office. During the campaign, his driver and bodyguard was Ted Bundy, the serial killer who was active in Republican Party politics in the late 1960s through the early 1970s.

Fletcher's close race for Lieutenant Governor got the attention of newly elected President Richard Nixon, who gave Fletcher a job in the incoming administration as Assistant Secretary of Labor. An African American, he served in the Nixon, Ford, Reagan, and George H. W. Bush administrations.

In 1978, Fletcher ran for mayor of Washington, D.C., but was defeated by the popular Democrat Marion Barry. In 1995, he briefly pursued a bid for the Republican presidential nomination.

Numbers of his fellow Republicans were often at odds with the affirmative action policies which Fletcher initiated and supported as the chairman from 1990 to 1993 of the United States Commission on Civil Rights.

As head of the United Negro College Fund, Fletcher was rumored to have coined the famous slogan, "A mind is a terrible thing to waste." In point of fact, however, the motto was created by Forest Long, of the advertising agency Young & Rubicam, in partnership with the Ad Council.

Fletcher was a United States Army veteran during World War II and upon his death in 2005 was buried in Arlington National Cemetery.

References

Further reading
Golland, David H. A Terrible Thing to Waste: Arthur Fletcher and the Conundrum of the Black Republican. (Lawrence: University Press of Kansas, 2019) 
 Arthur Fletcher at BlackPast.Org

External links
 Seattle Times: Remembering Arthur Fletcher, Father of Affirmative Action (Mike Flynn, Nov. 11, 2018)
 

|-

1924 births
2005 deaths
20th-century American politicians
Activists for African-American civil rights
African-American Methodists
African-American people in Washington (state) politics
African-American people in Washington, D.C., politics
Burials at Arlington National Cemetery
Military personnel from Phoenix, Arizona
Players of American football from Arizona
Candidates in the 1978 United States elections
History of affirmative action in the United States
La Salle Extension University alumni
Candidates in the 1996 United States presidential election
Washington (state) Republicans
Washington, D.C., Republicans
African-American history of Washington (state)
20th-century Methodists
Baltimore Colts players
Washburn Ichabods football players